Cyril II may refer to:

 Patriarch Cyril II of Jerusalem (ruled (1846–1872)
 Pope Cyril II of Alexandria (ruled 1078–1092)
 Patriarch Cyril II of Alexandria, Greek Patriarch of Alexandria in the 12th century
 Cyril II of Constantinople, Ecumenical Patriarch of Constantinople in 1633, 1635–1636 and 1638–1639